Luigi Paleari (8 November 1941 – 2 August 2021) was an Italian professional footballer who played as a defender for Falck Arcore, Fanfulla and Como. For Como he made 264 appearances between 1965 and 1973, ranking him in eighth place on the club's all-time list.

References

1941 births
2021 deaths
Italian footballers
A.S.D. Fanfulla players
Como 1907 players
Serie B players
Serie C players
Association football defenders
People from the Province of Monza e Brianza
Footballers from Lombardy